A play-in game is a game, usually played at the beginning of a tournament or just prior to the tournament depending on how the tournament is defined. In a play-in, the lowest qualifiers and/or participants who have earned conditional qualification compete for qualification to the main portion of the tournament. This gives an added advantage to the higher or direct qualifiers, allowing them to rest and/or play non-elimination games, while the lower teams extend themselves by playing in elimination games. Further, teams that advance from a play-in must usually start the main tournament against the highest qualifier in the tournament and on the road. Having a play-in game allows for a tournament to have a number of teams that is not a power of two without having to grant byes in the main tournament. It also gives extra incentives for most if not all teams to play for, as better performing teams that would otherwise directly qualify relatively quickly instead have to try to continue winning, whether for the right to play a play-in qualifier and/or to avoid having to play in the extra game(s), while teams that would otherwise be eliminated from qualification just as quickly instead remain in contention for at least a play-in berth.

Examples 
 Major League Baseball Wild Card series (played since the 2012 season)
 National Football League Wild Card games
 Wild Card games at the start of the major Canadian curling championships (Scotties Tournament of Hearts and Tim Hortons Brier, played since 2018)
 NCAA Division I men's basketball tournament "First Four"
 MLS Cup playoffs First Round
 Indian Premier League Playoffs Eliminator
 NBA Play-In Tournament
 Australia Cup: A-League teams are limited to 10 entrants in the Round of 32. The first 8 teams in the league qualify, with the last two places determined by two separate play-in games, held between 4th to last place against last place, then 2nd last and 3rd last against each other.
 NCAA Season 97 seniors' basketball tournament, one-off play-in tournament during the COVID-19 pandemic in the Philippines
 League of Legends World Championship, 2 stage play-in before finals - Group Stage and Knockout Stage

See also
One-game playoff

References

Sports terminology
Tournament systems